La Perla Tapatía Supermarkets is a family-owned grocery store chain that opened its first store in Patterson, California in 1980.  It is now headquartered in Turlock, California. The chain currently has five stores in Modesto, Turlock, Riverbank, Patterson, and Hughson.

References

External links
Official site

Retail companies established in 1980
Supermarkets of the United States
1980 establishments in California
Companies based in Stanislaus County, California